Chris Keane (born 25 October 1978 in Drogheda) is a former Irish rugby union player. Keane began his provincial career with Connacht where he received 90 caps (65 Celtic/Magners League, 24 ERC Challenge Cup), the first coming against Cardiff Blues in a 6–3 victory. Keane made his Leinster debut on 5 October 2007 against Llanelli Scarlets in a 23–52 Celtic League defeat. On 15 December he made his first Heineken Cup appearance against Edinburgh at Murrayfield. Again it was a match that Leinster lost (29–10). He was released at the end of the 2010 season and subsequently retired from Rugby. Keane has been recognised by his country at sevens, colleges, and 'A' levels.

He is currently co-manager of Skerries Rugby Club with John Murphy.

References

External links
Leinster profile
Connacht Profile

1978 births
Living people
Irish rugby union players
Connacht Rugby players
Leinster Rugby players
Rugby union scrum-halves
Rugby union players from County Louth
People educated at Belvedere College